"The Truth Has a Ring to It" is the sixth episode of the second season of the American dark comedy crime television series Barry. It is the 14th overall episode of the series and was written by supervising producer Emily Heller, and directed by series co-creator Alec Berg. It was first broadcast on HBO in the United States on May 5, 2019.

The series follows Barry Berkman, a hitman from Cleveland who travels to Los Angeles to kill someone but finds himself joining an acting class taught by Gene Cousineau, where he meets aspiring actress Sally Reed and begins to question his path in life as he deals with his criminal associates such as Monroe Fuches and NoHo Hank. In the episode, Barry cuts ties with Fuches after his betrayal, prompting Fuches to find anything that could incriminate Barry. Meanwhile, Sally decides to rewrite her scene to depict a more truthful version of her story. 

According to Nielsen Media Research, the episode was seen by an estimated 1.99 million household viewers and gained a 0.8 ratings share among adults aged 18–49. The episode received critical acclaim, with critics praising the performances (particularly Hader and Goldberg), writing, character development and ending. For his performance in the episode, Bill Hader won Outstanding Lead Actor in a Comedy Series at the 71st Primetime Emmy Awards.

Plot
The LAPD holds a press conference regarding the deaths of Loach and Ronny, deeming them the result of Ronny's relationship with Loach's ex-wife. At Loach's base of operations, his ex-partner Mae Dunn (Sarah Burns) consoles Loach's widow. After they leave, Barry (Bill Hader) is revealed to have hidden in the store to recover any incriminating evidence against him.

After getting rid of the evidence, Barry tells Fuches (Stephen Root) that he is cutting ties with him, citing his collaboration with Loach. When Barry mentions that Gene (Henry Winkler) knows him better, Fuches calls him out for not telling him about killing Moss. Fuches then states his intentions to collaborate with Hank (Anthony Carrigan), but Barry mocks him, telling him he is nothing without him. Barry goes with Hank to check on his henchmen's training, which has improved drastically. After their training is over, Hank tells Barry that their debt has been settled, handing him a pin as a gift. One of his men, Mayrbeck (Nikita Bogolyubov), thanks Barry for giving him purpose and showing him how to be useful as a soldier.

At the acting class, Barry is told by Sally (Sarah Goldberg) that after her visit to Sam's hotel room, she rewrote her scene to tell a more truthful version of what happened. When they rehearse it in class, Sally struggles when performing it and leaves ashamed. Barry then asks Gene to help him perform the role of Sam in Sally's scene instead of performing his war scene. Gene instructs him to think of the worst thing he ever did, telling him to use his own story to find the emotion in Sally's scene. Meanwhile, Fuches has gone to Gene's lake house, intending to find any incriminating evidence of Moss' murder, staying in the woods through the night.

Sally puts even more pressure on her performance after she misses an appointment with her agent, Lindsay (Jessy Hodges). As they perform the scene, Barry uses his trauma over Moss' murder for inspiration, managing to deliver a terrifying and frightening performance, which is met with applause. Lindsay is revealed to have witnessed the performance and offers Sally a chance to use this for their own benefit in a performance for multiple industry personnel. Meanwhile, after struggling to find a lead, Fuches finally finds something crucial: Moss' car. Hank prepares to make his next move, when he finds that Esther (Patricia Fa'asua) and Cristobal (Michael Irby) have already discovered their plot, as one of Hank's men snitched on them after Hank insulted him. In the final scene, Gene dines at a restaurant. Unbeknownst to him, he is being watched by Fuches, who is seated across the room.

Production

Development
In April 2019, the episode's title was revealed as "The Truth Has a Ring to It" and it was announced that supervising producer Emily Heller had written the episode while series co-creator Alec Berg had directed it. This was Heller's second writing credit, and Berg's third directing credit.

Writing
Bill Hader explained Barry's decision to cut ties with Fuches, "I think Barry has come around to the idea that Fuches is wrong to him. I don't think Barry ever really views Fuches as dangerous, because Barry's the muscle in the relationship."

Regarding Barry settling his debt to Hank, Hader explained "we always just wanted to make sure that he had to train the Chechens and the Chechens go from terrible to really good under Barry's tutelage, but in doing so he's starting the violent cycle again. He's given the purpose to another nice guy who like Barry happens to be naturally good at it."

Filming
Two scenes didn't make the first cut of the episode. The first involved delving into Barry's past when he talked to Gene, but Alec Berg felt the scene didn't work. Another scene involved Barry and Fuches having their discussion under a bridge instead of next to a bathroom, where they talked more about their history together. As the writers expressed displeasure with the scene and some other aspects, they re-shot many scenes in March 2019. The initial cut of the episode ran 50 minutes long, so the writers had to cut many scenes for time constraints.

Reception

Viewers
The episode was watched by 1.99 million viewers, earning a 0.8 in the 18-49 rating demographics on the Nielson ratings scale. This means that 0.8 percent of all households with televisions watched the episode. This was a slight decrease from the previous episode, which was watched by 2.03 million viewers with a 0.9 in the 18-49 demographics.

Critical reviews

"The Truth Has a Ring to It" received critical acclaim. Vikram Murthi of The A.V. Club gave the episode an "A-" and wrote, "Barry finally acknowledges Fuches' abuser status: he manipulates Barry into doing his bidding by convincing him that it's for his own good. But now that Barry has wormed his way out of his clutches yet again, Fuches will do anything to get him back. In last week's tour-de-force episode, Barry's blood-loss dreams suggest that Fuches was the devil. Tonight's last shot—Fuches pushed to the far edge of the frame, shot from behind, as he watches Gene eat dinner at the restaurant where Moss and him had their first date—all but confirms it. He's standing on your shoulder, ready to ruin your life." 

Nick Harley of Den of Geek gave the episode a 3.5 star rating out of 5 and wrote, "The table has been set for Barrys final two episodes, and if the end of this episode is any indication, big changes could be on horizon for everyone."

Accolades
Bill Hader submitted the episode in consideration for his Outstanding Lead Actor in a Comedy Series at the 71st Primetime Emmy Awards. Hader would end up winning the award, his second Emmy award for the series.

References

External links
 "The Truth Has a Ring to It" at HBO
 

Barry (TV series) episodes
2019 American television episodes